Brad Turner may refer to:

Brad Turner (director), television director
Brad Turner (ice hockey) (born 1968), former AHL/NHL hockey player
Brad Turner, fictional character in the cartoon series M.A.S.K.
 Brad Turner (musician), Canadian jazz trumpeter